Struther Arnott   (25 September 1934 – 20 April 2013) was a Scottish molecular biologist and chemist who specialised in cancer research. He was a principal and vice-chancellor of the University of St Andrews.


Education and career
Struther Arnott was born in Larkhall, Lanarkshire, and educated at the Hamilton Academy (1945–52) where in 1952 he received the academy's gold medal for general scholarship and silver medal in chemistry and in mathematics, and from which school he won 5th place overall and 1st science place in the University of Glasgow Open Bursary Competition, 1952.

Following graduation (BSc (Chemistry and Mathematics), 1956), followed by PhD (Chemistry), 1960), Struther worked with the Biophysics Unit of King's College London, before his appointment as Professor of Molecular Biology at Purdue University, Indiana.
At Purdue he served as head (chairman) of the Department of Biological Sciences, vice-president for Research and dean of the Graduate School. He returned to the United Kingdom to serve as principal and vice-chancellor at St Andrews from 1986 until his retirement in December 1999.

Awards and honours
He held visiting fellowships at the University of Oxford and was a fellow of King's College London. He was elected a Fellow of the Royal Society (FRS) in 1985, and of the Royal Society of Edinburgh in 1988, and was made a Commander of the Order of the British Empire in 1996. He was a member of the Advisory Council of the Campaign for Science and Engineering.

References

1934 births
2013 deaths
People educated at Hamilton Academy
Fellows of the Royal Society
Fellows of the Royal Society of Edinburgh
Fellows of the Royal Society of Chemistry
Scottish scholars and academics
Academics of the University of St Andrews
Academics of King's College London
Fellows of King's College London
Commanders of the Order of the British Empire
Alumni of the University of Glasgow
Principals of the University of St Andrews
Purdue University faculty
Scottish biologists
Scottish chemists
People from Larkhall